The 2020 CEBL season was the second season of the Canadian Elite Basketball League (CEBL). It was played from July 25 to August 9 at the Meridian Centre in St. Catharines, Ontario.

The season was scheduled to take place from May 7 to August 6, with the championship being played in Edmonton from August 14 to 16. On April 15, the season was postponed due to the COVID-19 pandemic.

A shortened 2020 season tournament, branded as the CEBL Summer Series, was held at the Meridian Centre in St. Catharines. A single round robin was played to eliminate one team, followed by a six-team single-elimination playoff. All games were played behind closed doors with no spectators admitted. The Edmonton Stingers defeated the Fraser Valley Bandits in the final to win their first CEBL title.

The 2020 season saw the inclusion of the Ottawa Blackjacks, the CEBL's seventh team and first expansion team. It was also the first in a three-year broadcast partnership with CBC Sports. Host broadcaster Mediapro utilized automated cameras, using AI technology to track the ball and players.

Rule changes 
The Elam ending, as used in The Basketball Tournament and the 2020 NBA All-Star Game, was adopted for all games; after the first stoppage within the final four minutes of the fourth quarter, the game clock is stopped, and a target score is established which is nine points greater than the leading team's score. The first team to reach the target score is declared the winner.

Summer Series

Round robin

Results

Playoffs

Quarter-finals

Semi-finals

Final

Awards
Source: 
Player of the Year: Xavier Moon, Edmonton Stingers
Canadian Player of the Year: Jordan Baker, Edmonton Stingers
U Sports Developmental Player of the Year: Lloyd Pandi, Ottawa Blackjacks
Defensive Player of the Year: Brianté Weber, Hamilton Honey Badgers
Referee of the Year: Frank Rizzuti
Clutch Player of the Year: Brianté Weber, Hamilton Honey Badgers 
Coach of the Year: Jermaine Small, Edmonton Stingers
CEBL Final MVP: Xavier Moon Edmonton Stingers

All-star teams

Statistics

Individual statistic leaders

References

External links 

Canadian Elite Basketball League
2019–20 in Canadian basketball
CEBL season
Sport in St. Catharines